Sergey Yermolenko (born 29 May 1972) is a Belarusian football coach and former player.

References

External links

1972 births
Living people
Soviet footballers
Belarusian footballers
Association football defenders
Belarusian expatriate footballers
Expatriate footballers in Latvia
Belarusian expatriate sportspeople in Latvia
FC Gomel players
FC Rechitsa-2014 players
FC Torpedo-BelAZ Zhodino players
FC Dinamo-93 Minsk players
FC Dinamo Minsk players
Skonto FC players
FC Dynamo Brest players
FC Shakhtyor Soligorsk players
FC Veras Nesvizh players
Belarusian football managers
FC Kommunalnik Slonim managers
People from Zhodzina
Sportspeople from Minsk Region